Ndèye Fatou Ndiaye (born 21 July 1994) is a Senegalese basketball player for Saint-Louis Basket Club and the Senegalese national team.

She participated at the 2018 FIBA Women's Basketball World Cup.

References

1994 births
Living people
Shooting guards
Senegalese expatriate basketball people in the United States
Senegalese women's basketball players
Hopkins High School alumni